Lindon Omrick Dinsley James (born 30 December 1984) is a Vincentian cricketer who has played for the Windward Islands in West Indian domestic cricket. He plays as a wicket-keeper and bats right-handed.

James made his first-class debut in January 2004, playing for the Windwards against Jamaica in the 2003–04 Carib Beer Cup. He scored his maiden first-class half-century during the 2006–07 season, making 55 against the Leeward Islands. In 2006 and 2008, James played for Saint Vincent and the Grenadines in the Stanford 20/20. Against Sint Maarten in the opening match of the 2008 tournament, he scored 73 not out from 37 balls, including four sixes. James was subsequently selected as the back-up wicket-keeper to Andre Fletcher in the Stanford Superstars team for the 2008 Stanford Super Series. He played in only a single match, an exhibition game against Trinidad and Tobago, but as a member of the squad shared in the prize money of US$12 million that was on offer to the winners. James later played several seasons in the Caribbean Twenty20, but has been unable to secure a contract with a Caribbean Premier League (CPL) franchise. His most recent games for the Windwards came in the 2014–15 Regional Four Day Competition.

References

External links
Player profile and statistics at CricketArchive
Player profile and statistics at ESPNcricinfo

1984 births
Living people
Saint Vincent and the Grenadines cricketers
Windward Islands cricketers
Wicket-keepers